Endla is a professional theatre in city of Pärnu, Estonia. 

The theatre was opened in 1911. The first performance was "Libahunt" ("Werewolf") by Estonian writer August Kitzberg. The Estonian Declaration of Independence was proclaimed from the theatre's balcony on 23 February 1918, one day before it was proclaimed in Tallinn. Endla was gutted by fire in 1944 and the Soviet authorities opted not to restore the theatre but to demolish it with explosives in 1961, due to it being an important symbol of Estonian independence.

From 1948 until 1986, actress and singer Olli Ungvere was engaged at the theater. Actor Margus Oopkaup was a performer at the theater from 1982 until 2000. Actress Lii Tedre was engaged at the theater from 1968 until 2010 and has frequently returned to the Endla as a guest actress.

External links

References

Theatres in Estonia
Buildings and structures in Pärnu
1911 establishments in the Russian Empire
Theatres completed in 1911
1911 establishments in Estonia
Tourist attractions in Pärnu County